The 1971–72 Pittsburgh Condors season was the 2nd and final season of the Pittsburgh Condors along with the 4th and final season of Pittsburgh involvement in the American Basketball Association. General manager Mark Binstein took over as coach after a 4–6 start. By the time the season was half over, the team was 17–25. From that point, the team went 8–34, with a losing streak of 12 near the end of the season sealing any hope of getting out of the cellar of the Division. One factor was despite being 1st in points scored at 119.2 per game, they were dead last in points allowed, at 126.4 per game.

Attendance had simply dried up, with games being moved (with one being moved to Uniontown, 46 miles from Pittsburgh) away from the Arena, with the team unofficially becoming the "United States Condors", with one game being played in Birmingham, Alabama. Fittingly, their penultimate game was played in Tucson, Arizona versus the Kentucky Colonels. On March 29, they played (and lost) their final game, 113–128 to the Indiana Pacers. Attempts to move the team failed after the season failed, and the league soon cancelled the franchise, ending pro basketball in Pittsburgh. Since then, no pro basketball team has played in Pittsburgh. The players were dispersed to other teams, with George Thompson  going to the Memphis Tams, Mike Lewis to the Carolina Cougars, Skeeter Swift to the Dallas Chaparrals, and Walt Szczerbiak to the Kentucky Colonels.

Roster  
 13 Nate Bowman - Center
 40 John Brisker - Small forward
 35 George Carter - Small forward
 30 Mickey Davis - Small forward
 10 Mike Grosso - Center
 13 Stew Johnson - Point forward
 14/22 Arvesta Kelly - Guard
 33 Dave Lattin - Point forward
 24 Mike Lewis - Center
 12 Jim Ligon - Point forward
 44 Jim O'Brien - Point guard
 15 Paul Ruffner - Center
 23 Skeeter Swift - Shooting guard
 12 Walt Szczerbiak - Small forward 
 22 Ron Taylor - Center
 25 George Thompson - Shooting guard
 20 Bob Verga - Point guard

Final standings

Eastern Division

Awards and honors
1972 ABA All-Star Game selections (game played on January 29, 1972)
 John Brisker
 George Thompson

References

 Condors on Basketball Reference

External links
 RememberTheABA.com 1971-72 regular season and playoff results
 Condors page

Pittsburgh Condors seasons
Pittsburgh
Pittsburg
Pittsburg